The 2014-15 Oman First Division League (known as the Omantel First Division League for sponsorship reasons) is the 39th edition of the second-highest division overall football league in Oman. The season began on 18 September 2014, and will conclude on 16 May 2015. Al-Khabourah SC are the defending champions, having won their third title in the previous 2013–14 season.

League table

Results

Clubs season-progress

Promotion/relegation play-off

1st Leg

2nd Leg

Sohar secured promotion after winning 2-1 on aggregate

OFA Awards
Oman Football Association awarded the following awards for the 2014-15 Oman Professional League season.
Top Scorer: Aremu Philip (Salalah)
Best Player: Vinicius Calamari Stephanie (Muscat)
Best Goalkeeper: Mohammed Huwaidi Al-Hooti (Muscat)
Best Coach: Mohammed Hawali (Muscat)
Best Team Manager: Hamdan Bait Said (Salalah)
Fair Play Award: Muscat

Media coverage

Controversies
On 7 March 2015, 10 out of 39 clubs attending a consultative meeting of the OFA walked out in protest midway into the proceedings. walkout was triggered by the OFA's decision to call off an Extraordinary General Meeting (EGM), which was originally scheduled for 7 March 2015. However, the OFA which had previously agreed for an EGM, on 6 March 2015 shelved the summit, citing a letter from the FIFA, football's world governing body. On the very next day, the OFA cancelled the membership of 11 clubs (Ahli Sidab, Al-Ittifaq, Al-Kamel Wa Al-Wafi, Al-Musannah, Al-Seeb, Bowsher, Dhofar, Fanja, Ibri, Ja'lan and Nizwa) for illegally withdrawing from the consultative meeting conducted by the OFA.

See also
2014–15 Oman Professional League
2014–15 Sultan Qaboos Cup

References

Oman First Division League seasons
Oman
2014–15 in Omani football